"Murder on the Dancefloor" is a song written by Gregg Alexander and Sophie Ellis-Bextor, produced by Alexander and Matt Rowe for Ellis-Bextor's first album, Read My Lips (2001). Released on 3 December 2001, the song peaked at number two on the UK Singles Chart and stayed on the chart for 23 weeks. The song became a top-10 hit worldwide, charting within the top three in Australia, New Zealand, and four European countries. In the United States, where the song was serviced to radio in September 2002, the single reached number nine on the Billboard Dance Singles Sales chart. "Murder on the Dancefloor" is reported to have been the most played song in Europe in 2002.

Background and release
The follow-up single to "Take Me Home (A Girl Like Me)" was originally planned to be "Lover", an album track from Read My Lips, as read in first-edition album stickers and announced by the label, but for unknown reasons, the release was cancelled and replaced by "Murder on the Dancefloor".

In January 2019, a re-recorded orchestral version was released as the third single off Sophie Ellis-Bextor's greatest hits package The Song Diaries.

Chart performance
The song is Ellis-Bextor's greatest hit internationally. It was a hit in Australia, peaking at number three, staying in the top 50 for 20 weeks, being accredited Platinum by Australian Recording Industry Association, and becoming the 12th-highest-selling single of 2002.

Music video
The music video was directed by Sophie Muller and it centres around a dance competition. The winner's prize consists of a pair of golden high-heel shoes and a substantial amount of money. Desperate to win, Ellis-Bextor proceeds to sneakily injure and disqualify the majority of the other dancers. She causes one to slip on butter, before tripping up another, who sees her do it and angrily points at her to no avail. Next she slyly poisons a trio of potential rivals by spiking the punch during a refreshment period and then unstraps a contestant's clothes, causing her to run off. She finally frames a dancer for cheating on his partner, by planting a G-string on his person; this results in his partner slapping him and exiting the dance floor.

Ellis-Bextor then turns her attention to the trio of judges. By using what seems to be chloroform, she incapacitates the only female judge on the panel. Once the competition is down to the final four couples, Ellis-Bextor notices that the lead judge (played by Colin Stinton) has a weak spot for beautiful women. Using this to her advantage, Ellis-Bextor approaches him when he is alone at the judging table and seduces him. Lovestruck, the lead judge succeeds in persuading the remaining judge to have Ellis-Bextor declared the winner, much to her fellow dancers' disapproval.

The video concludes with the other dancers grudgingly applauding (before promptly deserting) Ellis-Bextor and her dance partner, as she happily clutches her cash prize and the golden shoes on the winner's podium.

Track listings

UK and Australasian CD single
 "Murder on the Dancefloor" – 3:53
 "Never Let Me Down" – 3:43
 "Murder on the Dancefloor" (Parky & Birchy remix) – 7:24
 "Murder on the Dancefloor" (video)

UK 12-inch single
A1. "Murder on the Dancefloor" (G-Club vocal mix) – 5:09
A2. "Murder on the Dancefloor" (Jewels & Stone mix) – 5:39
B1. "Murder on the Dancefloor" (Phunk Investigation vocal mix) – 5:07
B2. "Murder on the Dancefloor" (extended album version) – 5:32

UK cassette single and European CD single
 "Murder on the Dancefloor" – 3:53 
 "Murder on the Dancefloor" (Jewels & Stone mix) – 5:39

German maxi-CD single
 "Murder on the Dancefloor" (radio edit) – 3:37
 "Murder on the Dancefloor" (extended album version) – 5:32
 "Murder on the Dancefloor" (Jewels & Stone mix edit) – 4:50
 "Murder on the Dancefloor" (G-Club vocal mix edit) – 5:10
 "Murder on the Dancefloor" (Phunk Investigation vocal edit) – 5:07
 "Murder on the Dancefloor" (Parky & Birchy remix) – 7:22
 "Murder on the Dancefloor" (Twin Murder remix) – 7:11

US CD single
 "Murder on the Dancefloor" (radio edit) – 3:37
 "Murder on the Dancefloor" (extended album version) – 5:32
 "Murder on the Dancefloor" (Jewels & Stone remix) – 5:39
 "Murder on the Dancefloor" (Parky & Birchy remix) – 7:24

Credits and personnel
Credits are lifted from the Read My Lips album booklet.

Studios
 Recorded at Mayfair Studios (London, England)
 Mixed at Townhouse Studios (London, England)
 Mastered at Sony Music Studios (London, England)

Personnel

 Sophie Ellis-Bextor – writing
 Gregg Alexander – writing
 Yoad Nevo – guitars, percussion, programming
 John Themis – guitars
 Guy Pratt – bass
 Wired Strings – strings
 Rosie Wetters – string leader
 Nick Franglen – programming
 Matt Rowe – production
 Jeremy Wheatley – additional production, mixing
 Marco Rakascan – vocal recording
 James Loughrey – engineering
 Laurence Brazil – engineering assistant
 John Davis – mastering

Charts

Weekly charts

Year-end charts

Certifications and sales

Release history

Covers and samples
A Chinese version by Hong Kong singer Kelly Chen entitled "最愛你的是我" or "Zui Ai Ni De Shi Wo" was produced in 2003 and was included in her album, "心口不一". 

A reggae version was released in 2005 by Swedish rapper Papa Dee with reworked lyrics under the title of "Murder In The Dancehall", it features Richie Stephens & General Degree. Grime artist Skepta sampled the track on "Love Me Not" on his 2019 album Ignorance Is Bliss.

References

2001 singles
2001 songs
Music videos directed by Sophie Muller
Polydor Records singles
Song recordings produced by Gregg Alexander
Songs written by Gregg Alexander
Songs written by Sophie Ellis-Bextor
Sophie Ellis-Bextor songs
Universal Records singles